José Giovanni (22 June 1923, Paris, France – 24 April 2004, Lausanne, Switzerland) was the pseudonym of Joseph Damiani, a French writer and film-maker of Corsican origin who became a naturalized Swiss citizen in 1986.

A former collaborationist and criminal who at one time was sentenced to death, Giovanni often drew his inspiration from personal experience or from real gangsters, such as Abel Danos in his 1960 film Classe tous risques, overlooking that they had been members of the French Gestapo. In his films as well as his novels, while praising masculine friendships and advocating the confrontation of the individual against the world, he often championed the underworld but was always careful to hide his own links with the Nazi occupiers of France during World War II.

Biography

Youth
Of Corsican descent, Joseph Damiani received a good education, studying at the Collège Stanislas de Paris and the Lycée Janson de Sailly. His father, a professional gambler who was sentenced to a year in prison for running an illegal casino, owned a hotel in the French Alps in Chamonix. Joseph worked there as a young man and became fascinated by mountain climbing.

The Occupation and Collaborationism
From April to September 1943 Damiani was a member of Jeunesse et Montagne (Youth and Mountain) in Chamonix, part of the Vichy Government youth movement controlled by Pierre Laval.

In February 1944 Damiani came to Paris and through his father's friend, the LVF leader Simon Sabiani, he joined Jacques Doriot's fascist French Popular Party (PPF). His maternal uncle, Ange Paul Santolini alias "Santos", who ran a restaurant patronized by the Gestapo, and his elder brother, Paul Damiani, a member of the Vichy paramilitary Milice, introduced Joseph into the Pigalle underworld.
 
In March 1944 Joseph Damiani went to Marseille where he became a member of the German Schutzkorps (SK), an organization which hunted down Service du travail obligatoire - STO (Compulsory Work Service) dodgers. He served as bodyguard to its Marseille chief and took part in many arrests, often blackmailing his victims.

In Lyon, in August 1944, posing as a German police officer along with an accomplice (Orloff, a Gestapo agent who was shot for treason at the Liberation), Damiani blackmailed Joseph Gourentzeig and his brother-in-law Georges Edberg, two Jews who were in hiding. Gourentzeig had bribed a member of the Milice - a friend of Damiani’s – in an attempt to secure his parents' release from a detention camp. They were not freed and Gourentzeig's father, Jacob, was shot by the Germans shortly after, on 21 August 1944, along with 109 Jewish hostages in the Bron (Lyon airport) massacre.

The triple murder
After the Liberation in Paris on 18 May 1945, Joseph Damiani, his brother Paul, Georges Accad, a former Gestapo agent, and Jacques Ménassole, a former member of the Milice wearing a French Army lieutenant's uniform - all posing as Military Intelligence officers - abducted Haïm Cohen, a wine merchant, accusing him of being a black marketeer. He was tortured until he gave them the key to his safe and a check for 105,000 francs. He was then shot and his body thrown into the Seine. Joseph Damiani cashed the check at Barclay's Bank under the identity of "Count J. de Montreuil".

A few days later, on 31 May 1945, the same gang, still masquerading as French Army Intelligence, abducted two brothers, Jules and Roger Peugeot, electrical appliance manufacturers in Maisons-Alfort. The brothers were forced, at gunpoint, to write a letter stating that they had been in business with the Germans and in contact with the Gestapo. The gang then demanded a million francs for destroying the letter. The Peugeot brothers refused and were tortured until they revealed where they had hidden 125 Louis d'or gold coins. They were then shot and their bodies buried in the woods near Versailles.

Joseph Damiani, who had accidentally shot himself in the leg during the struggle with the Peugeot brothers, was arrested at home in early June 1945. Accad was also apprehended. On 12 June 1945 Ménassole, on the point of being arrested, committed suicide in the Rue Montmartre métro station. Paul Damiani was arrested in Strasbourg in July 1945, escaped in December and was shot dead in a gunfight between gangsters on 17 July 1946 in a bar in Nice.

Twenty years hard labor and Dégradation nationale for Collaboration with the enemy
On 20 July 1946 Joseph Damiani was sentenced to twenty years hard labor by the Marseille Court of Justice for his participation in the German Schutzkorps and in the arrest of Frenchmen sent to the STO (Compulsory Work Service) in Germany.
He was also sentenced to Dégradation nationale (deprivation of all civil rights) for life for having been a member of the PPF fascist party.

Sentenced to death for three premeditated murders
Damiani had admitted during the investigation that he had shot Roger Peugeot, but he denied it in court. Tried by the Paris Cour d'Assises, Georges Accad and Joseph Damiani were sentenced to death on 10 July 1948 for the premeditated murders of Haïm Cohen, Roger Peugeot and Jules Peugeot. Damiani escaped the guillotine when his and Accad's sentences were commuted by President Vincent Auriol on 3 March 1949 to hard labor for life.

Ten years imprisonment for blackmailing hidden Jews during the Occupation
On 25 May 1949 Damiani was sentenced by the Paris Correctional Tribunal to ten years imprisonment for having blackmailed at gunpoint Joseph Gourentzeig (hiding from the Gestapo under the name "André Courent") and his brother-in-law Georges Edberg in Lyon on 11 August 1944.

Eleven and a half years in prison
On 14 November 1951, Damiani's sentence was reduced to twenty years hard labor. Finally, President René Coty remitted the sentence on 30 November 1956 and Joseph Damiani was released from prison at the age of thirty-three on 4 December 1956 after serving eleven and a half years.

The writer and film-maker
Straight after his release from prison, Damiani wrote his first novel, The Break (Le Trou), under the name of "José Giovanni". It tells of the escape he attempted from prison with four other inmates by digging a tunnel from their cell into the Paris sewers in 1947 when he was awaiting trial for murder. His lawyer, who had encouraged him to write, took the book to author and editor Roger Nimier through whom it was published by Éditions Gallimard. His style, at times uncouth and clumsy, can surprise the reader with its strong and sometimes disturbing scenes. The novel was turned into a film by Jacques Becker in 1960.

In 1958 the editor Marcel Duhamel introduced Giovanni to the Série noire publishing imprint, where he came to notice with the publication of three novels that same year:
 Classe tous risques, which was filmed by Claude Sautet in 1960.
 L'Excommunié, which Jean Becker adapted into the film Un nommé La Rocca starring Jean-Paul Belmondo in 1961, and was later remade by Giovanni in 1972 as La Scoumoune, with Belmondo in the same part and Claudia Cardinale.
 Le deuxieme souffle (Second Breath), filmed by Jean-Pierre Melville in 1966, with a remake, by Alain Corneau.

José Giovanni wrote twenty-one novels and a volume of memoirs (Mes Grandes Gueules).

After having worked with Jacques Becker on the adaptation of The Break, Giovanni wrote thirty-three film scripts and directed fifteen movies.

Revelation of a hidden past
In January 1984, Joseph Damiani was declared "rehabilitated", which did not absolve him - there was no retrial - but restored his civil rights.

During his lifetime José Giovanni never gave a clear explanation for his death sentence, though he took pride in being a former gangster and having been on death row. However, he never mentioned that he had been convicted for Collaborationism with the Nazis or for extorting money from Jews during the Occupation.

On 14 October 1993, two Swiss dailies, La Tribune de Genève and 24 Heures, revealed his past and that José Giovanni was in fact the same person as Joseph Damiani, the convicted fascist militant. At first Giovanni denied the accusations, claiming he had helped the Résistance and then insisting that he had been sentenced to death for a crime that had nothing to do with Collaborationism. He threatened to sue the press for slander but never did. Finally, he stated : "I've paid. I am entitled to forgiveness and oblivion".

Last years
José Giovanni defended right-wing values, the family, law and order and tougher punishment but was a staunch opponent of the death penalty. However, he believed in personal vengeance: "Any man that snatches a child from its mother's arms deserves death".

In his last years he spent time visiting prisons. From 1968 on, he lived in the Swiss village of Marécottes, not far from Chamonix, and died from a brain haemorrhage on 24 April 2004 in Lausanne.

Books
 1957: Le Trou (The Break)
 1958: Le Deuxième Souffle (Second Breath)
 1958: Classe tous risque (Consider All Risks)
 1958: L'Excommunié
 1959: Histoire de fou
 1960: Les aventuriers (The Adventurers)
 1962: Le Haut-Fer (High Fear)
 1964: Ho!
 1969: Meurtre au sommet n°866 (Murder on Summit 866)
 1969: Le Ruffian (The Ruffian)
 1977: Mon ami le traître
 1978: Le Musher (The Great Husky Race)
 1982: Les Loups entre eux
 1984: Un vengeur est passé
 1985: Le Tueur de dimanche
 1987: Tu boufferas ta cocarde
 1995: Il avait dans le cœur des jardins introuvables (My Father Saved My Life) - Memoirs
 1997: La Mort du poisson rouge (The Death of the Goldfish)
 1998: Le Prince sans étoile
 1999: Chemins fauves (Favorite Paths)
 2001: Les Gosses d'abord
 2002: Mes grandes gueules - Memoirs
 2003: Comme un vol de vautours (Like a Flight of Vultures)
 2004: Le pardon du grand Nord (The Forgiveness of the Far North)

Filmography
[FD] : film director, [Sc] : screenwriter, [DW] : dialogue writer, [Wr] : writer of the original novel
1960 : Le Trou (The Hole), directed by Jacques Becker [Sc, Wr] starring Raymond Meunier, Michel Constantin 
1960 : Classe tous risques (The Big Risk aka. Consider All Risks), [Sc, DW, Wr] directed by Claude Sautet starring Lino Ventura, Jean-Paul Belmondo
1961 : Un nommé La Rocca, directed by Jean Becker [Di, Wr : L'Excommunié] starring Jean-Paul Belmondo
1962 : Du rififi chez les femmes (The Riff Raff Girls), directed by Alex Joffé [Sc] starring Nadja Tiller, Robert Hossein 
1963 : , directed by Jacques Deray [Sc] starring Charles Vanel, Michel Auclair 
1963 :  Rififi in Tokyo, directed by Jacques Deray [DW] starring Charles Vanel, Karlheinz Böhm 
1965 : That Man George, directed by Jacques Deray [Sc] starring George Hamilton, Claudine Auger
1965 : Les Grandes Gueules (The Wise Guys), directed by Robert Enrico [DW, Wr : Le Haut-Fer] starring Bourvil, Lino Ventura
1966 : To Skin a Spy, directed by Jacques Deray [Sc] starring Lino Ventura
1966 : Le Deuxième souffle (Second Breath), directed by Jean-Pierre Melville [Wr] starring Lino Ventura
1967 : Les Aventuriers (The Last Adventure), directed by Robert Enrico [Sc, DW, Wr] starring Lino Ventura, Alain Delon, Joanna Shimkus
1967 : La Loi du survivant [FD, Sc, DW, Wr : second part of Les Aventuriers] starring Michel Constantin, Roger Blin
1968 :  [FD, Sc] starring Lino Ventura
1968 : Ho!, directed by Robert Enrico [Sc] starring Jean-Paul Belmondo, Joanna Shimkus 
1969 : Le Clan des Siciliens (The Sicilian Clan), directed by Henri Verneuil [Sc] starring Alain Delon, Jean Gabin, Lino Ventura
1970 : Dernier domicile connu (Last Known Address) [FD, Sc] starring Lino Ventura, Marlène Jobert
1971 :  [FD, Sc] starring Jean-Claude Bouillon, Nicoletta
1971 :  [FD, Sc] starring Rufus et Jean Gaven
1972 : La Scoumoune (The Hit Man) [FD, Sc, Wr : L'Excommunié] starring Jean-Paul Belmondo, Claudia Cardinale
1973 : Deux Hommes dans la ville (Two Men in Town aka. Two Against the Law) [FD, Sc] starring Jean Gabin, Alain Delon 
1975 : Le Gitan [FD, Sc, Wr : Histoire de fou] starring Alain Delon, Annie Girardot 
1976 : Comme un boomerang [FD, Sc] starring Alain Delon
1979 : Les Égouts du paradis (The Sewers of Paradise) [FD, Sc] starring Jean-François Balmer, Francis Huster, based on the criminal adventures of Albert Spaggiari 
1980 :  [FD, Sc] starring Annie Girardot, Claude Brasseur 
1983 : Le Ruffian [FD, Sc, Wr : Les Ruffians] starring Lino Ventura, Bernard Giraudeau, Claudia Cardinale
1985 : Among Wolves [FD, Sc] starring Claude Brasseur, Niels Arestrup 
1988 :  [FD, Sc, Wr] starring André Dussollier, Jean-Pierre Bernard 
1991:  (TV film) [FD] starring Michel Sardou, Lorraine Pilkington, Thérèse Liotard
2000:  [FD, Sc, Di, Wr : Il avait dans le cœur des jardins introuvables] starring Bruno Cremer, 
2007:  (Second Breath), remake directed by Alain Corneau [Wr] starring Daniel Auteuil, Michel Blanc, Jacques Dutronc
2014 : Two Men in Town American remake of Deux Hommes dans la ville, directed by Rachid Bouchareb [Sc] starring Forest Whitaker, Harvey Keitel, Ellen Burstyn, Luis Guzmán and Brenda Blethyn

References

Further reading
 Joseph Damiani, alias José Giovanni by Franck Lhomeau in Temps noir, la Revue des Littératures Policières N° 16, September 2013. Éditions Joseph K. - 22 rue Geoffroy Drouet, 44000 Nantes, France

French mystery writers
French film directors
French male screenwriters
20th-century French screenwriters
French collaborators with Nazi Germany
French Popular Party politicians
French fascists
People of Vichy France
French prisoners sentenced to death
Prisoners sentenced to death by France
French people of Corsican descent
1923 births
2004 deaths
Collège Stanislas de Paris alumni
Lycée Janson-de-Sailly alumni
20th-century French male writers
French emigrants to Switzerland
French people convicted of murder
People convicted of murder by France
People convicted of treason against France